Pakyong Airport  is a seasonal domestic airport serving Pakyong, Gangtok, the capital of Sikkim, India.

At 4,646 ft, Pakyong Airport is one of the five highest airports in India. It is also the first greenfield airport constructed in the Northeast India, the 100th operational airport in India, and the only airport in the state of Sikkim.

Inaugurated on 24 September 2018 by Prime Minister Narendra Modi, commercial flight operations started 4 October 2018. Upon its opening, major media across the globe praised its engineering and described it as one of the most scenic airports in the world. However, commercial flights have remained inoperative due to known weather conditions, being originally planned and designed as a Visual Flight Rules (VFR) Airport. Due to these visibility issues along with agitation from the local villagers who were displaced and strip area issues, the airport's only commercial passenger airline SpiceJet temporarily suspended flight operations to the airport effective 1 June 2019. After a suspension of 19 months, flight operations by SpiceJet resumed on 23 January 2021, following the establishment of Required Navigation Performance (RNP) approaches.

History 
Prior to the construction of Pakyong Airport, Sikkim had been the sole state in India possessing no functional airport.

The project to develop Pakyong Airport was approved by the Cabinet Committee on Economic Affairs in October 2008. The Punj Lloyd Group was awarded the  contract to construct a runway, taxiway, apron drainage system, and electrical work for the greenfield airport in January 2009. The foundation stone for the greenfield airport was laid by the then Civil Aviation Minister, Praful Patel, in February 2009.

The project was initially slated to be completed by 2012, but protests by local villagers, demanding proper rehabilitation and compensation, had resulted in suspension of work in January 2014. The AAI intervened and held discussions with agitating villagers and paid part compensation allowing work to resume in October 2014. However, in January 2015, work came to a halt once again as villagers took to protests. In July 2015, AAI and the State Government signed an MoU with AAI, promising to shift the affected households by 15 August so that AAI could resume work from October 2015. Maximally ecological slope-stabilization techniques were used to remedy the landslide situation.

On 5 March 2018, an IAF Dornier 228 landed on the completed airstrip, becoming the first aircraft to land at Pakyong.
SpiceJet had been awarded the Pakyong to Kolkata and Guwahati sectors under the second round of bidding for the Government's UDAN Regional Connectivity Scheme in January 2018
and it conducted a trial landing of its Q400 aircraft after getting approval from DGCA for M/s SpiceJet at Pakyong on 10 March 2018. The airport received its commercial operating license from the Directorate General of Civil Aviation (DGCA) on 5 May 2018.

On 5 December 2019, 35 families affected by the airport's construction signed off on a joint agreement and accepted the first installment in compensation for their loss of land bringing years of protest to a close.

Structure 

Navigation facilities include DVOR, High Intensity Runway Lights (HIRL), Aerodrome beacon, and a PAPI.

The Pakyong Airport project is one of the tallest reinforced soil structures in the world.
The land for the airport was carved from the mountainside using massive geotechnical 'cut and fill' engineering works. These state-of-the-art geogrid soil reinforcement and slope stabilisation techniques were employed as traditional retaining structures and embankments were ruled out as being unfeasible.

Commercial flight operations 

Although initially praised by worldwide media upon its opening as being "a breathtaking piece of engineering on the roof of the world" offering arriving passengers "one of the most dramatic airport approaches on the planet", the airport's commercial flight operations have since been disrupted by poor weather conditions affecting flight visibility. In December 2018, 21 of SpiceJet's 31 daily flights (nearly 70% of its schedule) were forced to divert to Bagdogra (up to a five-hour drive away) because Pakyong "lacked the requisite navigation equipment for low-visibility situations", being a Visual flight rule (VFR) Airport as originally planned as per MOU 2002 & MOU 2015 among Civil Aviation GOI, Tourism Deptt Govt of Sikkim and AAI. Currently, Pakyong requires at least 5 km (5,000m)under Visual flight rule (VFR) conditions for Non-Schedule Airlines. For schedule flight operations by SpiceJet Required navigation performance (RNP) procedure was approved by DGCA with visibility requirement of 2,400m.

On 1 June 2019, SpiceJet, the airport's sole airline providing commercial passenger service, temporarily suspended its once daily Kolkata-Pakyong-Kolkata flight due to "unpredictable weather in Pakyong which results in very low visibility", having earlier suspended the other daily service between Pakyong and Guwahati. Airline officials also cited the approaching monsoon season's aggravating effect on flight operations when announcing the service suspension. SpiceJet earlier conveyed that they will restart flight operation with effect from winter schedule i.e., 27 October 2019, however, the flight operations remained suspended for the rest of the year and 2020.

In addition to fluctuating weather, adequate basic strip area (western side) issues have also hampered commercial flight operations. The basic strip, which is mandated to be a minimum of 75 m wide, is only 40 m in western side & 80m wide Eastern side along 2 km long. Contractors have been "unable to take up Civil works to extend the stretch of basic strip and erect a strong RCC Retaining wall with anchoring system" because the State Government of Sikkim at the time had not compensated few of the affected landowners. On 5 December 2019, it was reported that 35 families affected by the airport's construction had been offered a compensation of 20.6 crore by the State Government and that there would be support in ensuring the full completion and operation of the airport. On 18 November 2020, a trial landing was conducted at the airport by SpiceJet involving a Required navigation performance (RNP) procedure and commercial flight operations resumed on 23 January 2021 after a suspension of 19 months. Upon its resumption, the first ever Delhi-Pakyong direct flight started from 23 January 2021 while flights to Kolkata resumed on 1 February 2021.
No flights are operational from the airport, as of October 2022.

Airline and destinations

Passenger amenities 
Pakyong Airport has snack bar, Prepaid Taxi counter for passengers within its premises. Prepaid taxis can be availed on a very reasonable rate to visit nearby cities like Gangtok, Namchi, Mangan, Pelling etc. or any other tourist places of Sikkim on hiring basis. The airport is just 1 kilometre away from NH717A at Pakyong.

Military flight operations 
As Pakyong Airport sits approximately 60 km (37.28 mi) from the India-China border, it is considered strategically important. In March 2018, the Indian Air Force (IAF) was the first to land an aircraft, a Dornier 228, at the airport. And in January 2019, an IAF Antonov-32 transport plane arrived "in an effort to boost the transportation of troops and material to this region." At present security is being provided by State government of Sikkim as per MoU dated 30.6.2015 signed among Government of Sikkim, Ministry of Civil Aviation, Government of India and Airports Authority of India.

See also

 Military bases 
 List of ALGs
 List of Indian Air Force stations
 India-China military deployment on LAC
 List of disputed India-China areas
 Tianwendian
 Ukdungle

 Borders
 Line of Actual Control (LAC)
 Borders of China
 Borders of India

 Other related topics
 India-China Border Roads
 List of extreme points of India
 Defence Institute of High Altitude Research

References

External links 

Airports in Sikkim
Airports in Pakyong District
Transport in Sikkim
 Pakyong district
Airports established in 2018
Transport in Gangtok
2018 establishments in Sikkim